Road system may refer to:
Road designation or abbreviation
Road network, a system of interconnecting lines and points that represent a system of streets or roads for a given area